Maxomys tajuddinii is a species of rodent in the genus Maxomys. It is found in Indonesia and Malaysia. It is a rodent of medium size, with a tail length of 106.9-122.3 mm, feet of 27.62-30.04 mm and a weight of up to 70 g.

References

Rodents of Malaysia
Maxomys
Rodents of Indonesia
Mammals described in 2012